Michael Patrick Guest (born February 4, 1970) is an American attorney and Republican politician. He has represented  in the United States House of Representatives since 2019. He became the ranking member of the United States House Committee on Ethics upon the August 2022 death of Jackie Walorski, and became its chair in the 118th Congress after Republicans won a House majority that November.

Early life and education
Michael Patrick Guest was born on February 4, 1970. He graduated from Mississippi State University with a bachelor's degree in accounting and the University of Mississippi School of Law with a Juris Doctor. He served as the Assistant District Attorney for Madison and Rankin counties from 1994 to 2008, and became District Attorney in 2008.

U.S. House of Representatives

Elections

2018 

In the six-way June Republican primary election, Guest received the most votes (45%), with Whit Hughes coming in second with 22%. Because no candidate received 50% of the vote, Guest and Hughes faced each other in a primary runoff election, which Guest won. Guest defeated State Representative Michael Evans, the Democratic nominee, in the general election.

Guest campaigned as a strong supporter of President Donald Trump.

2020 

Guest was reelected in 2020 with 64.7% of the vote, defeating Democrat Dort Benford.

Tenure
In December 2020, Guest was one of 126 Republican members of the House of Representatives to sign an amicus brief in support of Texas v. Pennsylvania, a lawsuit filed at the United States Supreme Court contesting the results of the 2020 presidential election, in which Joe Biden defeated Trump. The Supreme Court declined to hear the case on the basis that Texas lacked standing under Article III of the Constitution to challenge the results of an election held by another state.

On May 19, 2021, Guest was one of 35 Republicans who joined all Democrats in voting to approve legislation to establish the January 6, 2021 commission meant to investigate the storming of the U.S. Capitol.

In June 2022, after a leaked decision by the Supreme Court of the United States to revoke the right to abortion in the case of Dobbs v. Jackson Women's Health Organization, Guest wrote to the Department of Homeland Security to demand action in the wake of attacks by Jane's Revenge, which Guest called an "anarchist extremist group" that targets crisis pregnancy centers and other anti-abortion organizations.

In August 2022, Guest was named ranking member of the House Ethics Committee upon the death of former ranking member Jackie Walorski.

Committee assignments 
Committee on Ethics (Chair-Acting)
Committee on Homeland Security
Subcommittee on Border Security, Facilitation and Operations
Committee on Foreign Affairs
Subcommittee on Europe, Eurasia, Energy, and the Environment
Subcommittee on the Western Hemisphere, Civilian Security and Trade

Caucus memberships 

 Army Caucus
 Border Security Caucus
 Chicken Caucus
 Fire Services Caucus
 Freshman Working Group on Addiction 
 Law Enforcement Caucus
 National Guard and Reserve Caucus
 Prayer Caucus
 Pro-Life Caucus
 Republican Study Committee
 Rice Caucus
 Sportsman Caucus
 Steel Caucus
 Suburban Caucus
 Unmanned Systems Caucus

Electoral history

References

External links
 Congressman Michael Guest official U.S. House website
Michael Guest for Congress

|-

|-

1970 births
21st-century American politicians
District attorneys in Mississippi
Living people
Mississippi State University alumni
Politicians from Woodbury, New Jersey
Republican Party members of the United States House of Representatives from Mississippi
University of Mississippi School of Law alumni